The KLCC Tunnel (formerly Lorong Kuda) is a tunnel in Kuala Lumpur city, Malaysia. This tunnel is maintained by KLCC Holdings Berhad and Dewan Bandaraya Kuala Lumpur (DBKL) (Kuala Lumpur City Hall).

List of interchanges  

Highways in Malaysia
Road tunnels in Malaysia
Roads in Kuala Lumpur
Expressways and highways in the Klang Valley
Tunnels completed in 1997